Francis Maxwell may refer to:

 Francis Aylmer Maxwell (1871–1917), British Army officer 
 Francis William Maxwell (1863–1941), British architect